Susan E. Willcox (born 6 April 1954 in Bristol) is a British archer.

Archery

She took part in the 1983 World Archery Championships and finished 52nd individually and twelfth in the team event.

Willcox competed at the 1984 Summer Olympic Games and came 31st in the women's individual event with a total of 2398 points.

References

External links 
 Profile on worldarchery.org

1954 births
Living people
British female archers
Olympic archers of Great Britain
Archers at the 1984 Summer Olympics
Sportspeople from Bristol
20th-century British women